Torturing Democracy is a 2008 documentary film produced by Washington Media Associates and narrated by Peter Coyote. The film details the use of tortureeuphemistically referred to as "enhanced interrogation techniques"including waterboarding, by the Bush administration in the "War on Terror". The documentary includes interviews from U.S. State Department and military personnel, including former Deputy Secretary of State Richard Armitage.

See also
Taxi to the Dark Side

External links
Transcript hosted at George Washington University

American documentary films
Documentary films about American politics
Documentary films about war
2008 films
Extrajudicial prisoners of the United States
Torture in the United States
War on terror
Presidency of George W. Bush
Documentary films about human rights
2000s English-language films
2000s American films